Aciura coryli is a species of tephritid or fruit flies in the genus Aciura of the family Tephritidae.

The larvae of this species live in flowers of Phlomis and Ballota (Labiatae). Its distribution encompasses the entire Mediterranean region, where it is often collected in locations with large stocks of host plants. In contrast, the published finds from Central Europe (Austria, Hungary, Czech Republic) are old and the species has not been confirmed in these countries in recent decades. The present relatively modern evidence deserves our attention because it is evidence of the still existing occurrence in Central Europe. - The plant genus Phlomis does not occur in East Tyrol (FISCHER et al. 2005), Ballota nigra occasionally in the valley of Lienz and near Virgen.

References 

Tephritinae
Insects described in 1794
Diptera of Europe